Plinthisus is a genus of dirt-colored seed bugs in the family Rhyparochromidae. There are around 100 described species in Plinthisus.

See also
 List of Plinthisus species

References

External links

 

Rhyparochromidae
Articles created by Qbugbot